Best Actor in a Leading Role is a British Academy Film Award presented annually by the British Academy of Film and Television Arts (BAFTA) to recognize an actor who has delivered an outstanding leading performance in a film.

Superlatives

Note: Dustin Hoffman's total of eight nominations, includes his 1968 Most Promising Newcomer nomination for The Graduate.

Winners and nominees 
From 1952 to 1967, there were two Best Actor awards: one for a British actor and another for a foreign actor. In 1968, the two prizes of British and Foreign actor were combined to create a single Best Actor award. Its current title, for Best Actor in a Leading Role, has been used since 1995.

1950s

1960s

1970s

1980s

1990s

2000s

2010s

2020s

Note: All nominations for multiple performances in a single year from the 1950s to the 1970s count as one nomination. The two mentions for Michael Caine (1983) and Anthony Hopkins (1993) count as two separate nominations.

Multiple nominations

7 nominations
 Michael Caine
 Daniel Day-Lewis
 Peter Finch
 Dustin Hoffman
 Jack Lemmon
 Laurence Olivier

6 nominations
 Marlon Brando
 Leonardo DiCaprio
 Albert Finney
 Sidney Poitier

5 nominations
 Dirk Bogarde
 Robert De Niro
 Anthony Hopkins
 Spencer Tracy

4 nominations
 Ralph Fiennes
 Tom Hanks
 Jack Hawkins
 Trevor Howard
 Kenneth More
 Paul Newman
 Peter Sellers

3 nominations
 Woody Allen
 Richard Attenborough
 Richard Burton
 George Clooney
 Tom Courtenay
 Russell Crowe
 Alec Guinness
 Gene Hackman
 Burt Lancaster
 Fredric March
 Walter Matthau
 Viggo Mortensen
 Jack Nicholson
 Gary Oldman
 Sean Penn
 Joaquin Phoenix
 Kevin Spacey

2 nominations
 Christian Bale
 Alan Bates
 Warren Beatty
 Jamie Bell
 Jean-Paul Belmondo
 Jeff Bridges
 Jim Broadbent
 Nicolas Cage
 Sean Connery
 Bradley Cooper
 Benedict Cumberbatch
 Tony Curtis
 James Dean
 Gérard Depardieu
 Johnny Depp
 Michael Douglas
 Richard Dreyfuss
 Michael Fassbender
 Colin Firth
 Henry Fonda
 Pierre Fresnay
 Jake Gyllenhaal
 Jean Gabin
 John Gielgud
 George Hamilton
 Laurence Harvey
 William Holden
 Bob Hoskins
 Charles Laughton
 Ian McKellen
 John Mills
 Yves Montand
 James Mason
 Marcello Mastroianni
 Al Pacino
 Gregory Peck
 Brad Pitt
 Jonathan Pryce
 Anthony Quinn
 Michael Redgrave
 Eddie Redmayne
 Ralph Richardson
 Geoffrey Rush
 George C. Scott
 Martin Sheen
 Takashi Shimura
 Frank Sinatra
 Rod Steiger
 James Stewart
 Robin Williams
 Nicol Williamson
 Donald Wolfit

Multiple wins

5 wins
 Peter Finch

4 wins
 Daniel Day-Lewis

3 wins
 Marlon Brando 
 Anthony Hopkins
 Jack Lemmon

2 wins
 Dirk Bogarde
 Colin Firth
 Dustin Hoffman
 Burt Lancaster
 Marcello Mastroianni 
 Jack Nicholson
 Rod Steiger

See also
 Academy Award for Best Actor
 Critics' Choice Movie Award for Best Actor
 Guldbagge Award for Best Actor in a Leading Role
 Golden Globe Award for Best Actor – Motion Picture Drama
 Golden Globe Award for Best Actor – Motion Picture Musical or Comedy
 Screen Actors Guild Award for Outstanding Performance by a Male Actor in a Leading Role

References

External links
 BAFTA Awards Database

British Academy Film Awards
 
Film awards for lead actor